The 2014–15 Boston Bruins season was their 91st season in the National Hockey League (NHL).
Despite earning 96 points, the Bruins did not qualify for the 2015 Stanley Cup playoffs, ending their seven-season playoff streak. At the time, this was the most points ever by a team who did not qualify, surpassing the 95 points earned by the 2006–07 Colorado Avalanche and the 2010–11 Dallas Stars. The Bruins held this record for three seasons, until the 2017–18 Florida Panthers tied their record. The Montreal Canadiens achieved the same thing the next season.

Off-season
On May 21, 2014, the Vancouver Canucks announced that Bruins assistant general manager Jim Benning had been hired as the Canucks' new general manager. Bruins' general manager Peter Chiarelli announced that he would be looking "internally and externally to replace that position."
On June 27, Peter Chiarelli announced that club had promoted Scott Bradley to assistant general manager after he spent five seasons as the team's director of player personnel. Chiarelli also announced that Ryan Nadeau was promoted to director of hockey operations/analytics. The club also hired John Ferguson, Jr. as executive director of player personnel. Ferguson had previously been a part of the San Jose Sharks organization since 2008.

Standings

Suspensions/fines

Schedule and results

Pre-season

Regular season

Player stats 
Final
Skaters

Goaltenders

†Denotes player spent time with another team before joining Bruins. Stats reflect time with the Bruins only.
‡Denotes player was traded mid-season. Stats reflect time with the Bruins only.

Notable achievements

Awards

Milestones

Transactions 
The Bruins have been involved in the following transactions during the 2014–15 season:

Trades

Free agents acquired

Free agents lost

Claimed via waivers

Lost via waivers

Player signings

Other

Draft picks

Below are the Boston Bruins' selections made at the 2014 NHL Entry Draft, held on June 27–28, 2014 at the Wells Fargo Center in Philadelphia, Pennsylvania. 

Draft notes
Boston's third-round pick will go to the Philadelphia Flyers as the result of a trade on March 5, 2014, that sent Andrej Meszaros to Boston in exchange for this pick (being conditional at the time of the trade). The condition – Philadelphia will receive a third-round pick in 2014 if Meszaros does not re-sign with Boston prior to the 2014 NHL Entry Draft – was converted on June 27, 2014.
Boston's sixth-round pick will go to the St. Louis Blues, as the result of a trade on April 3, 2013, that sent Wade Redden to Boston, in exchange for this pick (being conditional at the time of the trade). The condition – St. Louis will receive a sixth-round pick in 2014 if Redden appears in one playoff game in 2013 for the Bruins – was converted on May 1, 2013.

References

Boston Bruins seasons
Boston Bruins
Boston Bruins
Boston Bruins
Boston Bruins
Bruins
Bruins